Wayne Chaney Jr. is senior pastor at the over 2,000 member Antioch Church of Long Beach in Long Beach, California, USA. The church was founded by Chaney's grandfather.

In October 2013, Chaney made his television debut on the Oxygen network show "Preachers of L.A.," a show which follows six heads of churches through their personal and spiritual lives.

He along with his wife Myesha Chaney founded the Long Beach Gospel Fest. Long Beach Gospel Fest has grown to be one of the largest Gospel experiences with over 20,000 attendees. They also are the hosts of LA's talk radio show Real Life with the Chaney's on Stevie Wonder's 102.3FM KJLH.

Personal life 
Chaney attended Morehouse College, Luther Rice College & Seminary, Fuller Seminary, Claremont School of Theology and is currently in doctoral studies at Duke Divinity School.

Wayne Chaney Jr. is the grandson of Dr. T. M. Chambers Sr. and of Rev. Joe Chaney Jr. He is married to Myesha Chaney. The couple have three children.

Pastor Wayne Chaney serves as the senior pastor of The Antioch Church of Long Beach, California.

Filmography and TV appearances 

Chaney and his wife Myesha are featured on the Oxygen series Preachers of L.A. According to The Christian Post, Wayne and Myesha Chaney agreed to showcase their marriage on television in order to represent "a Godly marriage on television."  A controversy arose around pastor Chaney's statement that "We want people to know you can be saved, sanctified, and sexual... God made us that way." Chaney, his wife, and the other "Preachers" were criticized in the press for the affluent lifestyles the program portrayed them as living.

 2013: Preachers of L.A. Season 1
 2014: Preachers of L.A. Season 2

Chaney has also appeared on Extra, Access Hollywood, Showbiz Tonight, Arsenio Hall, Access Hollywood, The Real, Insider, Boris and Nicole, Lift Every Voice and News One Now with Roland Martin.

Bibliography 
Your Miraculous Potential: Maximizing God's Creativity, Power and Direction. (2016)

Honors and awards 

Chaney received the 2010 Martin Luther King Jr. Peace Maker Award from the city of Long Beach.

Footnotes 

Living people
Year of birth missing (living people)